Radha Krishna is the combined forms of feminine and masculine realities of God in Hinduism.

Radha Krishna may also refer to:

Media
Radha Krishna (1933 film), a Bengali religious film released in 1933
The Radha Krsna Temple (album), a 1971 album of devotional songs by the London Radha Krishna Temple
RadhaKrishn, Indian television series released in 2018

People
Krish (director) (born Radha Krishna Jagarlamudi on 11 November, 1978), an Indian film director
 Sarvepalli Radhakrishnan Second President of India 
Radha Krishna Choudhary (15 February 1921 – 15 March 1985), a professor, writer, and historian
Radha Krishna Kishore, an Indian politician
Radha Krishna Kumar (born 2 August 1984), an Indian film director and producer
Radha Krishna Mainali (born 26 September, 1946), a Nepalese politician
S. Radha Krishna, an Indian film producer

Places
Radha Krishna Temple, an International Society for Krishna Consciousness temple located in London, England
Radha Krishna Temple, Dallas, a Hindu temple located in Dallas, Texas

See also
Radhakrishnan (name), list of people with this given name or surname